Teressa Claire MacNeille (née Payne; born June 20, 1951) is an American voice actress, whose credits include voicing Dot Warner on the animated television series Animaniacs and its reboot, Babs Bunny on Tiny Toon Adventures, Chip and Gadget Hackwrench on Chip 'n Dale: Rescue Rangers, and Daisy Duck in various Disney media since 1999. She has also worked on animated series such as The Simpsons, Futurama, Rugrats, and Hey Arnold!

Early life
MacNeille loved cartoons as a child and wanted to be a voice actress from the age of eight, but instead chose a "practical" career, feeling she would never be able to realise her ambition. She graduated from the University of California, Berkeley, and attended broadcasting school, becoming a disc jockey.

Career
MacNeille worked in numerous jobs and had many minor voiceover roles before becoming a regular on an animated TV show. In her words: "I'd been doing radio spots, some TV, demos, sound-alikes, industrial narrations—anything that came my way for about two years." She was also a member of the improvisational comedy group The Groundlings for ten years. MacNeille took acting workshops and worked as a casting assistant for voice acting talent agent Bob Lloyd in what she calls "The University of Voice-over." Lloyd and fellow agent Rita Vennari got MacNeille her first role on an animated show: a part in an episode of the 1979 Scooby-Doo and Scrappy-Doo.

She sang and appeared (as Lucille Ball) in the music video for "Weird Al" Yankovic's song "Ricky" (1983), which was based on the I Love Lucy television show and parodied the song "Mickey" by Toni Basil. MacNeille and Mary Kay Bergman also appeared on Yankovic's 1999 album Running with Scissors, on the tracks "Pretty Fly for a Rabbi" and "Jerry Springer".

MacNeille was cast as Babs Bunny in Tiny Toon Adventures (1990–1992). Writer Paul Dini said that MacNeille was good for the role because she could do both Babs's voice and the voices of her impressions. MacNeille commented: "The best part of doing Babs is that she's a mimic, like me...In the show I do Babs doing Billie Burke, Hepburn, Bette Davis, Madonna and Cher. I even have her doing Jessica Rabbit." The success of Tiny Toon Adventures led to the series Animaniacs. MacNeille was brought in to voice Dot Warner, one of the show's three main characters, because Dot's character was very similar to Babs Bunny. Andrea Romano, the voice director and caster for Animaniacs, said that the casters had "no trouble" choosing the role of Dot: "Tress MacNeille was just hilarious (...) And yet [she had] that edge." MacNeille was nominated for an Annie Award for her performance on the show in 1995.

She has provided voices for numerous films, television shows, video games and commercials, garnering over 200 credits. MacNeille says: "The characters that I do all come from people in my own life – as well as the material I've stolen from my friends!". Her TV roles include characters on The Simpsons, where she voices Agnes Skinner, Brandine Spuckler and Lindsey Naegle, and Futurama, in which her main role was the character Mom. MacNeille has provided voices on many other television shows and cartoons such as Rugrats (as Charlotte Pickles), Chip 'n Dale Rescue Rangers (as Chip and Gadget Hackwrench), TaleSpin (as Kitten Kaboodle), Histeria!, Hey Arnold! and Dave the Barbarian (as Fang), as well as dubbing work on English-language anime translations.

She is the voice of Daisy Duck and Wilma Flintstone since 1999 and 2000 respectively. MacNeille also appeared as an angry anchorwoman in Elvira, Mistress of the Dark and served as the voice of Elvira's Great-Aunt Morganna Talbot. She provided voice acting for the 2003 Wile E. Coyote and the Road Runner short feature The Whizzard of Ow.

Filmography

Film

Animation

Anime

Video games

Live-action

Theme parks

Music videos

Audiobooks

References

External links

 
 
 

1951 births
Living people
20th-century American actresses
21st-century American actresses
Actresses from Los Angeles
American impressionists (entertainers)
American video game actresses
American voice actresses
Audiobook narrators
Disney people
Hanna-Barbera people
Singers from Los Angeles
University of California, Berkeley alumni
Nickelodeon people
Cartoon Network people